The 1921 Gotha state election was held on 6 March 1921 to elect the 15 members of the Landtag of Gotha.

Results

References 

Gotha
Elections in Thuringia
March 1921 events